Philosophy of pain may be about suffering in general or more specifically about physical pain. The experience of pain is, due to its seeming universality, a very good portal through which to view various aspects of human life. Discussions in philosophy of mind concerning qualia has given rise to a body of knowledge called philosophy of pain, which is about pain in the narrow sense of physical pain, and which must be distinguished from philosophical works concerning pain in the broad sense of suffering. This article covers both topics.

Historical views of pain

Two near contemporaries in the 18th and 19th centuries, Jeremy Bentham and the Marquis de Sade had very different views on these matters. Bentham saw pain and pleasure as objective phenomena, and defined utilitarianism on that principle.  However the Marquis de Sade offered a wholly different view – which is that pain itself has an ethics, and that pursuit of pain, or imposing it, may be as useful and just as pleasurable, and that this indeed is the purpose of the state – to indulge the desire to inflict pain in revenge, for instance, via the law (in his time most punishment was in fact the dealing out of pain).  The 19th-century view in Europe was that Bentham's view had to be promoted, de Sade's (which it found painful) suppressed so intensely that it – as de Sade predicted – became a pleasure in itself to indulge.  The Victorian culture is often cited as the best example of this hypocrisy.

Various 20th century philosophers (viz. J.J.C. Smart, David Kellogg Lewis, D.M. Armstrong) have commented upon the meaning of pain and what it can tell us about the nature of human experiences.  Pain has also been the subject of various socio-philosophical treatises.  Michel Foucault, for example, observed that the biomedical model of pain, and the shift away from pain-inducing punishments, was part of a general Enlightenment invention of Man.

The individuality of pain
It is often accepted as a priori principle that one has inherent knowledge of one's own consciousness simply by virtue of dwelling within an "inner world" of the mind.  This drastic distinction between inner world and outer world was most popularized by René Descartes when he solidified his principle of Cartesian dualism.  From the centrality of one's own consciousness springs a fundamental problem of other minds, the discussion of which has often centered on pain.

Pain and meaning

The philosopher Nietzsche experienced long bouts of illness and pain in his life, and wrote much about the meaning of pain as it relates to the meaning of life in general.  Among his more famous quotes, are ones specifically related to pain:

"Did you ever say yes to a pleasure?
Oh my friends, then you also said yes to all pain.
All things are linked, entwined, in love with one another."

"What does not kill me, makes me stronger."

Pain and theories of mind
The experience of pain has been used by various philosophers to analyze various types of philosophy of mind, such as dualism, identity theory, or functionalism.  David Lewis, in his article 'Mad pain and Martian pain', gives examples of various types of pain to support his own flavor of functionalism.  He defines mad pain to be pain which occurs in a madman who has somehow gotten his "wires crossed" (possibly an early observation distinguishing normal pain from either clinical psychalgia or schizophreniac pain) in such a way that what we usually call "pain" does not cause him to cry or roll in agony, but instead to, for example, become very concentrated and good at mathematics.  Martian pain is, to him, pain which occupies the same causal role as our pain, but has a very different physical realization (e.g. the Martian feels pain due to the activation of an elaborate internal hydraulic system rather than, for example, the firing of C-fibers).  Both of these phenomena, Lewis claims, are pain, and must be accounted for in any coherent theory of mind.

See also 
 Nociception
 Pain
 Pain asymbolia
 Perception
 Suffering

References

Further reading

External links
Pain (Stanford Encyclopedia of Philosophy)
Bibliography—Philosophy of Pain
Wittgenstein's Beetle - Philosophy Online

Pain